"Every Second" is a song written by Gerald Smith and Wayne Perry, and recorded by American country music artist Collin Raye.  It was released in February 1992 as the third and final single from his debut album All I Can Be.

Chart performance
The song debuted at number 75 on the Hot Country Singles & Tracks chart dated February 29, 1992. It charted for 20 weeks on that chart, and peaked at number 2 on the chart dated May 23, 1992.

Charts

Year-end charts

References

1992 singles
Collin Raye songs
Epic Records singles
1991 songs
Songs written by Wayne Perry (country music)